Lordshill is a district in Southampton, England. It is situated in the northern part of the city.

History of Lordshill 

According to the Anglo-Saxon Charter of 956, Aldermoor, Lordswood, Lordshill and Coxford are all within the ancient boundary of the Manor of Millbrook and were farmland within the county of Hampshire, until the 20th century, when it was absorbed into Southampton.

Southampton, by 1954, continued to rapidly expand itself into Millbrook, Redbridge and Harefield, but still there was insufficient land available for more housing to satisfy its needs. Lordshill, with its  was bought in 1964 to cater for the growing demand. Hampshire planners gave approval for new homes to cater for the 2,000 people at that point in time.

Prior to 1964, when Hampshire County Council bought the land to make what Lordshill is today, it was little more than farmland and one dead-end road that dropped down to Old Rownhams Lane to Tanner's Brook, between the Bedwell Arms Public House and Aldermoor Road. This lane was known to be steep with water frequently running down it from various springs. It got the nickname "Soapsuds Alley" because the washerwomen living there would normally throw their soapy water on to the road and the soapy water and the natural springs would mix causing a foaming torrent.

By 1967, Lordshill had been incorporated within Southampton city boundaries and has been so ever since.

By 1969 development was in full swing building the new housing estates, roads and roundabouts that we know of today.

In 1982, development took place to produce 60 self-contained flats that would accommodate 122 senior citizens, which would become known as Manson Court.

In August 2006, Sinclair Junior School closed its doors for the last time and the land was leased to the then private housing company called Spectrum Housing Group Association, now called Sovereign Housing, who then demolished the old school. Nothing remains of the old junior school now, other than a memorial stone dedicated to former headteacher Mr Williams, which is on the outside of the block of flats called Williams House. Today, Berwick Close covers the whole of the former school grounds. In January 2010, Spectrum Housing Group brought the house on the corner of Sinclair Road/Berwick Close, which, in the early years, when both schools were opened, belonged to the caretaker. This house was later demolished and replaced with flats.

During late 2013 and early 2014, Oaklands Community School was demolished to make way for new housing, leaving only the swimming pool and the small community room in place.

Lordshill today

Today, Lordshill is mostly residential housing with over 4000 mixed council and private dwellings for around 12,500 people.

Education 

Local education includes two primary and junior schools: Sinclair School, which is a mixed primary and junior school; and the other being Fairisle Infant School and Fairisle Junior School.

A secondary school called Oasis Academy Lord's Hill, which was located on Fairisle Road, took over the former Oaklands Community School in 2008. During December 2010, plans for a new secondary school were given the go-ahead on Lordshill recreational ground called Five Acres, following the change from state run to academy run and the merge with Millbrook school. The new school building opened in September 2012.

Community 

The local community areas have a mix of different shops as well as a library, church and a healthcare centre; the main shopping area is called Lordshill District Centre. The library is a single story building that opened in 1977.

Oaklands includes a swimming pool. This was closed in July 2012 after a leak was found. The Labour council leaders consulted over whether or not it would be economically viable to get it repaired at a cost of £500,000. The closure of the pool meant a loss of 20 jobs. On 14 February 2014, the work needed to repair and reopen Oaklands swimming pool was approved at a cost of £1.7 million which is being funded by Southampton City Council, the pool was reopened in January 2015.

On 9 May 2015, Lordshill Community Centre was relocated from their old building on Andromeda Road to their new brick building on May Cromarty Road, which is sited next to Oaklands swimming pool; the centre was in use from 11 May 2015 with the official opening taking place on 23 May 2015.

Transport 

Buses

It is served by a number of frequent bus services by First Hampshire & Dorset Southampton, Bluestar and Xelabus, providing various links to the city centre, surrounding areas and other cities, towns and villages like Romsey and Hedge End.

In 2015, First Hampshire & Dorset started a new service between Lordshill and Marwell Zoo, which ran between May and August twice a week.

Trains

Its nearest major railway station is Southampton Central which most buses serve on the way into the city centre. Its nearest small railway station is Redbridge, no buses from Lordshill serve this train station.

Cycleways

There are a large number of paths covering the Lordshill area. These appear to have been intended for cycle use, alongside the parallel pedestrian paths. Many of these have fallen into disrepair and only a few are signed as permitted cycle routes.

References 

Areas of Southampton
Housing estates in Hampshire